Timmy Time is a British stop-motion animated children's comedy series made for the BBC by Aardman Animations. The series premiered on 6 April 2009 and ended on 13 July 2012, with a total of 80 episodes over the course of 3 seasons.

Series overview

Episodes

Series 1 (2009)

Series 2 (2010)

Series 3 (2011–2012)

External links
 
 
 

Lists of British animated television series episodes